Okanogan Legion Airport  is a city-owned, public-use airport located one nautical mile (2 km) east of the central business district of Okanogan, a city in Okanogan County, Washington, United States.

Facilities and aircraft 
Okanogan Legion Airport covers an area of 30 acres (12 ha) at an elevation of 1,042 feet (318 m) above mean sea level. It has one runway designated 4/22 with an asphalt surface measuring 2,533 by 36 feet (772 x 11 m).

For the 12-month period ending May 30, 2012, the airport had 4,100 aircraft operations, an average of 11 per day: 98% general aviation and 2% air taxi. At that time there were 14 aircraft based at this airport: 86% single-engine, 7% multi-engine, and 7% ultralight.

References

External links 
 Okanogan Legion Airport (S35) at WSDOT Airport Directory
 Aerial image as of July 1996 from USGS The National Map

<br/ >

1937 establishments in Washington (state)
Airports established in 1937
Airports in Washington (state)
Transportation buildings and structures in Okanogan County, Washington